Bishnu Kumar Karki is a Nepalese politician, belonging to the Nepali Congress currently serving as the member of the 2nd Federal Parliament of Nepal. In the 2022 Nepalese general election, he won the election from Nawalparasi (Bardaghat Susta East) 2 (constituency).

References

Living people
Nepal MPs 2022–present
Nepali Congress politicians from Gandaki Province
1963 births